= Ulster people =

Ulster people may refer to

- People from Ulster, a traditional province of Ireland
- People from Northern Ireland, a part of Ulster
- People from Ulster County, New York
